Nick Kyrgios was the defending champion, but retired from his first round match against Ugo Humbert due to a wrist injury.

Rafael Nadal won the title, defeating Taylor Fritz in the final, 6–3, 6–2. This was the third time that Nadal won the Acapulco Open, and the first time on hard court.

Seeds

Draw

Finals

Top half

Bottom half

Qualifying

Seeds

Qualifiers

Lucky losers

Qualifying draw

First qualifier

Second qualifier

Third qualifier

Fourth qualifier

References

External Links
Main draw
Qualifying draw

Abierto Mexicano Telcel - Singles
Men's Singles